No Problem is an album by trumpeter Chet Baker's Quartet featuring Duke Jordan which was recorded in 1979 and released the following year on the Danish SteepleChase label.

Reception 

The Allmusic review by Ron Wynn states "Pianist Duke Jordan's presence adds some punch and spark to this quartet session, which is further helped along by bassist Niels-Henning Ørsted Pedersen and selections that are suited for Baker's increasingly mellow and wavering playing.".

Track listing 
All compositions by Duke Jordan
 "No Problem" – 9:45
 "Sultry Eve" – 7:04
 "Glad I Met Pat" – 5:08
 "Kiss of Spain" – 7:15
 "The Fuzz" – 6:05
 "My Queen Is Home to Stay" – 7:13
 "Jealous Blues" – 8:48 Bonus track on CD release

Personnel 
Chet Baker – trumpet
Duke Jordan – piano
Niels-Henning Ørsted Pedersen – bass
Norman Fearrington – drums

References 

Chet Baker albums
1980 albums
SteepleChase Records albums
Instrumental albums